Arabibarbus hadhrami is a species of ray-finned fish in the genus Arabibarbus. The species is endemic to Yemen, where it is found in the Wadi Hadhramaut / Wadi al Masila drainage basin.

References

Arabibarbus
Fish described in 2014